FC Sputnik Rechitsa was a Belarusian football club based in Rechytsa.

The club was founded in 2017 after a relocation of FC DYuSSh-DSK Gomel to Rechytsa.
The club finished third in the 2018 Belarusian Second League season and in early 2019, they were offered a promotion to the First League, after a vacancy opened. Sputnik took the offer and made its First League debut in 2019.

On July 14th 2021, it became known that the club was dissolved after not being able to carry on being funded, resulting in withdrawal from the league and 3-0 wins being given to opponents for the rest of the season.

References

External links
 

Football clubs in Belarus
Gomel Region
2017 establishments in Belarus
2021 disestablishments in Belarus
Association football clubs established in 2017
Association football clubs disestablished in 2021
FC Sputnik Rechitsa